Nigel Quentin Frieda (born August 1952) is a British record producer, property owner of the  Osea Island in the estuary of the River Blackwater, Essex.

Early life
Nigel Quentin Frieda was born the son of Isidore Frieda, a Jewish hairdresser, salon and property owner, and an Irish Catholic mother. His elder brother is the hairdresser John Frieda.

Career
Frieda founded/launched the pop group the Sugababes. He runs London's Matrix Studio and has also produced The Rolling Stones.

Frieda is the owner of the  Osea Island in the estuary of the River Blackwater, Essex, England, most of which he bought in 2000 for £6 million. After 2012 he acquired the rest of the island.

He was involved in The Causeway Retreat, mostly for altruistic reasons, because of his personal connections to people who had had addiction and mental health problems.

Personal life
Frieda married the future biographer Leonie Frieda, the daughter of Swedish aristocrats, when she was 30 (her second marriage), and they had two children, Elizabeth and Jake, both now adults. They divorced in 1997. His second wife died from suicide.

References

1952 births
Living people
British record producers